Charles Conley may refer to:

 Charles C. Conley (1934–1984), American mathematician
 Charles Swinger Conley (1921–2010), attorney, civil rights leader and judge